Marco Frigo (born 2 March 2000) is an Italian cyclist, who currently rides for UCI ProTeam .

Major results
2018
 2nd Overall Giro del Nordest d'Italia
 3rd Gran Premio Sportivi di Sovilla
 5th Trofeo Buffoni
 5th Giro della Lunigiana 
 6th Trofeo Citta di Loano
2019
 1st  Road race, National Under-23 Road Championships
 2nd Trofeo Alcide Degasperi
2021
 1st Stage 1 Ronde de l'Isard
 2nd Time trial, National Under-23 Road Championships
 6th Overall Flanders Tomorrow Tour
2022
 1st Stage 4 Circuit des Ardennes
 2nd Trofeo Piva
 4th Overall Giro della Valle d'Aosta
 9th Overall Alpes Isère Tour

References

External links

2000 births
Living people
Italian male cyclists
People from Bassano del Grappa